"Midnight to Six Man" is a song by British garage rock band the Pretty Things. It was first published in 1966 and registered at number 46 in the UK Singles Chart and 19 in the Netherlands.

The arrangement is one of the fullest on early Pretty Things cuts, due to the piano of Nicky Hopkins (who played similar R&B piano on the Who's My Generation album) and Margo Lewis, the organist from the all-female band Goldie and the Gingerbreads.

Personnel 
Phil May – vocals
Dick Taylor – lead guitar
Brian Pendleton – guitar
John Stax – bass guitar
Skip Alan – drums

Chart performance

References

External links 

 

1966 singles
1966 songs
Pretty Things songs
Fontana Records singles
British psychedelic rock songs
British garage rock songs
Songs written by Dick Taylor
Song recordings produced by Glyn Johns